Nam-myeon, Yangju
 Nam-myeon, Chuncheon
 Nam-myeon, Yanggu
 Nam-myeon, Yeongwol
 Nam-myeon, Inje
 Nam-myeon, Jeongseon
 Nam-myeon, Hongcheon
 Nam-myeon, Buyeo
 Nam-myeon, Taean
 Nam-myeon, Yeosu
 Nam-myeon, Damyang
 Nam-myeon, Jangseong
 Nam-myeon, Hwasun
 Nam-myeon, Gimcheon
 Nam-myeon, Namhae